CAP21 may refer to:
Citizenship, Action, Participation for the 21st Century - a green liberal political party in France.
Collaborative Arts Project 21 - an Off-Broadway theatre company and musical theatre training conservatory.
A version of the Mudry CAP 20, a French single-seat aerobatic monoplane.